Ooni Degbinsokun was the 43rd Ooni of Ife, a paramount traditional ruler of Ile Ife, the ancestral home of the Yorubas. He succeeded Ooni Adegunle Adewela and was succeeded by Ooni Orarigba.

References

Oonis of Ife
Yoruba history